Filip Arsenovski (born 30 July 1998) is a Macedonian handball player who plays for GC Amicitia Zürich and the Macedonian national team.

He participated at the 2017 Men's Junior World Handball Championship.

References
http://ekipa.mk/metalurg-se-zasili-so-trojtsa-novi-rakometari/

1998 births
Living people
Macedonian male handball players
Sportspeople from Skopje